Robert Jones (born January 26, 1973) is an American exoneree who was wrongly convicted for rape and manslaughter, following the murder of British tourist Julie Stott in New Orleans in 1992. He served 23 years of a life sentence before being released from Louisiana State Penitentiary, after his conviction was overturned by the Louisiana Fourth Circuit Court of Appeal. After the Louisiana Supreme Court dismissed the state's appeal, the New Orleans District Attorney Leon Cannizzaro insisted on re-trying Jones on the same charges. However, as Jones was preparing for a pretrial hearing that looked to highlight prosecutorial misconduct in the case, the DA's office dropped all of the charges against him. As of January 2018, Jones was working for the Orleans Public Defender as a client advocate. Jones co-authored the book Unbreakable Resolve: Triumphant Stories of 3 True Gentlemen, which offers an accounting of his time before, during, and after prison. He also co-founded a non-profit youth mentoring organization, the Free-Dem Foundation.

References

1973 births
Living people
1992 crimes in the United States
Overturned convictions in the United States
American people convicted of manslaughter
Prisoners sentenced to life imprisonment by Louisiana
1992 in Louisiana